Wilfried Wesch (born 7 July 1940) is a German racewalker. He competed in the men's 20 kilometres walk at the 1972 Summer Olympics.

References

1940 births
Living people
Athletes (track and field) at the 1972 Summer Olympics
German male racewalkers
Olympic athletes of West Germany
Place of birth missing (living people)